Kuldscha is a genus of moths in the family Geometridae described by Sergei Alphéraky in 1883.

References

Larentiini